Four-beat Rhythm: The Writings of Wilhelm Reich (2013) is a compilation album published by Kreiselwelle Music / Workshop on which the writings of Wilhelm Reich are adapted to music. The album is an awareness-raising endeavor for Wilhelm Reich and his works and a fund-raising endeavor for The Wilhelm Reich Infant Trust. This non-profit entity was established by Wilhelm Reich and charged with 1) operating Orgonon as the Wilhelm Reich Museum, 2) protecting, preserving and transmitting Wilhelm Reich's scientific legacy to future generations, 3) safeguarding Wilhelm Reich's Archives and 4) helping infants, children and adolescents.

Artwork
The album cover is an original collage painting by Antony Zito.  Zito is known for painting portraits on the streets of the Lower East Side, NYC.

Track listing
All tracks written by Wilhelm Reich.

 Untitled I: Love, Work and Knowledge... — Benoît Pioulard	
 Song of Youth — Lines of Flight	
 The Sucker — Tim Fite
 Lonesome — Brother JT
 Thoughts of Import — Essra Mohawk
 Once Upon a Time — Grace Sings Sludge
 Prayer — Lines of Flight	
 Untitled II: Our Love-Life... — Salamander Wool
 Lied der Jugend — Tocotronic
 Untitled III: I Have Planted... — The Howling Hex

References

Concept albums
2013 compilation albums